Yukarıdere can refer to:

 Yukarıdere, Çaycuma
 Yukarıdere, Ilgaz
 Yukarıdere, Ulus